is a town located in Saitama Prefecture, Japan. , the town had an estimated population of 33,178 in 15,888 households and a population density of 970 persons per km².

Geography
Located in central Saitama Prefecture, Moroyama is approximately 50 kilometers from downtown Tokyo. The town straddles the Hachioji Tectonic Line where the Chichibu Mountains and the Kanto Plain meet, with gentle mountains in the west with an elevation of about 300–400 meters above sea level. From the central part to the eastern part, the town consists of flat land with an elevation of about 60 meters above sea level. Approximately 40 percent of the town area is forest and mountains, with a portion within the borders of the Kuroyama Prefectural Nature Park.

Surrounding municipalities
Saitama Prefecture
Sakado
Hidaka
Hannō
Ogose
Hatoyama

Climate
Moroyama has a humid subtropical climate (Köppen Cfa) characterized by warm summers and cool winters with light to no snowfall.  The average annual temperature in Moroyama is 13.3 °C. The average annual rainfall is 1746 mm with September as the wettest month. The temperatures are highest on average in August, at around 25.0 °C, and lowest in January, at around 1.6 °C.

Demographics
Per Japanese census data, the population of Moroyama peaked around the year 2000 and has declined since.

History
The area around Moroyama has been inhabited since at least the Jōmon period, and numerous archaeological sites are within the town limits. The area of the town is within the borders of ancient Musashi Province. Moro village was created within Iruma District, Saitama with the establishment of the modern municipalities system on April 1, 1889. Moro merged with neighboring Yamane village to form the town of Moroyama on April 1, 1939. Also in 1939, the author Saneatsu Mushanokoji founded Atarashiki-mura, an agricultural commune, which he intended for form the nucleus of a utopian settlement. Moroyama annexed neighboring Kawakado village on April 1, 1955. Road paving and housing developments in the early 1960s brought urbanization, population growth and change to areas previously devoted to mulberry fields. This new urban environment led to changes in the industrial structure including decreases in the agricultural population and an increase in the manufacturing and service industries.

Government
Moroyama has a mayor-council form of government with a directly elected mayor and a unicameral town council of 14 members. Moroyama, together with the towns of Hatoyama and Ogose, contributes one member to the Saitama Prefectural Assembly. In terms of national politics, the town is part of Saitama 9th district of the lower house of the Diet of Japan.

Economy
Moroyama remains largely an agricultural town, although it has increasing become a bedroom community.

Education
Saitama Medical University
Nihon Institute of Medical Science
Moroyama has four public elementary schools and two public middle schools operated by the town government, and one public high school operated by the Saitama Prefectural Board of Education. In addition, there is also one private middle school. The prefectural also operates one special education school for the handicapped.

Transportation

Railway
 JR East – Hachikō Line
 
 Tōbu Railway - Tōbu Ogose Line
  -   -

Highway
Moroyama is not served by any expressways or national highways

Local attractions
 Kamakita Lake
 Atarashiki-mura
 Izumoiwai Jinja

Noted people from Moroyama
Yuta Muto, professional baseball player
Daiya Seto,  World gold medalist swimmer

References

External links 

 Official Website 

Towns in Saitama Prefecture
Moroyama, Saitama